Audrey Merle (born 19 May 1995) is a French triathlete. In 2016, she was named in the French team for the 2016 Summer Olympics.

References

External links
 
 
 
 

1995 births
Living people
French female triathletes
Place of birth missing (living people)
Triathletes at the 2016 Summer Olympics
Olympic triathletes of France